Thaumetopoea pinivora, the eastern pine processionary, is a moth of the family Notodontidae. The species was first described by Georg Friedrich Treitschke in 1834. It is found in southeast and central Europe and Asia Minor.

The wingspan is 15–18 mm. The moths are on wing from May to September.

The larvae feed on Pinus species.

Sources 
 P.C.-Rougeot, P. Viette (1978). Guide des papillons nocturnes d'Europe et d'Afrique du Nord. Delachaux et Niestlé (Lausanne).

External links

Fauna Europaea
Lepiforum e.V.

Notodontidae
Moths of Europe
Taxa named by Georg Friedrich Treitschke
Moths described in 1834